Gribovka is a rural locality (a selo) and the administrative center of Gribovsky Selsoviet of Arkharinsky District of Amur Oblast, Russia. Population: 182 as of 2018.

Geography 
Gribovka is located on the right bank of the Arkhara River, 25 km east of Arkhara (the district's administrative centre) by road. Mogilyovka is the nearest rural locality.

References

Rural localities in Arkharinsky District